Chopourian v. Catholic Healthcare West, No. 2:09-CV-02972 (E.D. Cal. Feb. 29, 2012), was a court case in the United States District Court for the Eastern District of California which, at the time, was believed to be the largest single-plaintiff employment verdict in United States history at $167,720,488. The record has since been surpassed by the verdict in Juarez v. AutoZone Stores, Inc., Case No. 08-CV-00417-WVG (S.D. Cal. Nov. 17, 2014) at $185,872,719.52.

Background and Trial
Ani Chopourian was employed as a Physician Assistant by Catholic Healthcare West (now Dignity Health), Mercy General Hospital in the Cardio Vascular Operating Rooms (“CVOR”) from August 2006 to August 2008. A graduate of Yale University School of Medicine Physician Associates Program in 1999, Ms. Chopourian had been nationally certified by the National Commission on Certification of Physician Assistants since initially obtaining her license in 1999. As a Physician Assistant in the CVOR, Ms. Chopourian’s job responsibilities included the treatment and care for patients undergoing a variety of open heart surgeries including, but not limited to: Coronary Artery Bypass, Aortic/Mitral Valve Replacement, and Congenital Heart Defect Repair. In furtherance of this work, Ms. Chopourian supported heart surgery procedures by providing a number of important functions, including vein/artery harvesting, retraction of the sternum, and other technical functions to assist the heart surgeon. During her employment, Ms. Chopourian worked with numerous different heart surgeons in four different operating rooms in two separate facilities.

Within months of her employment, in or around October 2006, Ms. Chopourian spoke to her supervisor, Jean Scrafton, about the fact that she was not getting her meal breaks. Ms. Chopourian explained that, as a result of not being able to eat within the first five hours of her shift, she would feel lightheaded and was concerned her performance was being affected. Ms. Chopourian also made a written complaint about this fact in an “Event Report.” In addition to her complaints about lunch breaks, Ms. Chopourian submitted at least 18 written complaints to hospital managers concerning the working conditions in the hospital, including failure to provide required meal breaks, unsafe surgical conditions, bullying, mismanaged care during surgery, verbal abuse by one of the heart surgeons, mistreatment by a coworker, as well as other issues. Ms. Chopourian’s final complaint was submitted July 31, 2008 (8 days before her termination) and was stamped received by human resources.
 
According to the schedule for August 2008 given to Plaintiff regarding on-call assignments, there was no indication Ms. Chopourian would be required to provide post-surgical rounds on Sunday, August 3, 2008. On Saturday night, August 2, 2008, according to procedure, Ms. Chopourian called the PM assignment recording to see if she was needed, as she was on call. There was nothing on the outgoing message indicating she was needed on August 3, 2008. On Sunday, August 3, 2008, Ms. Chopourian received a call from the hospital asking why she was not present to provide post-surgical floor coverage. Ms. Chopourian explained that she was not aware floor coverage was required. Ms. Chopourian offered to come in to provide coverage, but was told not to do so, that coverage was already obtained and her presence was no longer required. On August 7, 2008, Catholic Healthcare West terminated Ms. Chopourian for failing to report to work on Sunday, August 3, 2008.

On August 1, 2009, almost a year after her termination from Catholic Healthcare West, Ms. Chopourian secured a position as a Physician Assistant with Radiological Associates of Sacramento Medical Group, Inc. (“RAS”). A condition of employment was that she would obtain privileging at Mercy General Hospital. Ms. Chopourian was originally informed by Mercy that there would be no problem obtaining privileging. She was then informed that she would need national certification to obtain privileging. Ms. Chopourian studied for and took the exam, then renewed her application. In the interim, Ms. Chopourian’s first deposition for her pending lawsuit against Catholic Healthcare West was taken on March 15, 2010. During the deposition, Defendant’s counsel questioned Ms. Chopourian about documents she recently produced in response to discovery requests and concluded on the record that Ms. Chopourian had violated medical privacy laws. Ms. Chopourian was never investigated for such a violation, assessed civil penalties, or charged with criminal violation. In May 2010, Ms. Chopourian was informed that her credentialing privileges were being held up because of allegations that she violated patient privacy laws. Ms. Chopourian was denied privileges on June 8, 2010 and subsequently lost her job at RAS on June 21, 2010.

Verdict
The verdict in favor of Plaintiff included $3,720,488 in economic damages, $39,000,000 in non-economic damages, and $125,000,000 in punitive damages. The trial lasted 11 days and the jury deliberated for 3 days before unanimously finding in favor of Plaintiff on her claims of hostile work environment, retaliation for workplace complaints, defamation, and intentional interference with economic advantage.

Trial Counsel
Counsel for Plaintiff:
Lead Counsel Lawrance Bohm, Bohm Law Group, Sacramento, CA
Erika M. Gaspar, Law Office of Erika M. Gaspar, Sacramento, CA
Gregory R. Davenport, Law Offices of Gregory R. Davenport, Stockton, CA

Counsel for Defense:
Lead Counsel Judith “Julie” C. Martin, La Follette, Johnson, De Haas, Fesler & Ames, Sacramento, CA
Mary E. Greene, La Follette, Johnson, De Haas, Fesler & Ames, Sacramento, CA
David Ditora, La Follette, Johnson, De Haas, Fesler & Ames, Sacramento, CA.

References

United States district court cases
United States employment discrimination case law